Sihuarani (possibly from Aymara siwara barley, "the one with barley") is a mountain in the Vilcanota mountain range in the Andes of Peru, about  high. It is located in the Cusco Region, Canchis Province, Checacupe District. Sihuarani lies southwest of Cóndor Sallani. The  Llancamayo flows along its southern slope.

References

Mountains of Cusco Region
Mountains of Peru